Eliza Clark may refer to:

 Eliza Clark (American writer), American actress and screenwriter
 Eliza Clark (Canadian author) (born 1963), Canadian author
 Eliza Clark Garrett (1805–1855), née Clark, American educator and philanthropist
 Eliza Clark Hughes (1817–1882), American physician

See also
 Elizabeth Clark (disambiguation)